The Lunatic Republic is a 1959 comedy novel by the British writer Compton Mackenzie. It parodies the ongoing Space Race.

References

Bibliography
 David Joseph Dooley. Compton Mackenzie. Twayne Publishers, 1974.

External links

1959 British novels
Novels by Compton Mackenzie
Novels set on the Moon
Chatto & Windus books